Miguel Barasorda (4 September 1909 – December 1981) was a Puerto Rican sports shooter. He competed at the 1948 Summer Olympics, 1960 Summer Olympics and 1968 Summer Olympics.

References

External links
 

1909 births
1981 deaths
Puerto Rican male sport shooters
Olympic shooters of Puerto Rico
Shooters at the 1948 Summer Olympics
Shooters at the 1960 Summer Olympics
Shooters at the 1968 Summer Olympics
Sportspeople from Ponce, Puerto Rico
20th-century Puerto Rican people